Fremantle Roosters Rugby League Club is an Australian rugby league football club based in Western Australia formed in 1948 (from rugby union). They conduct teams for both junior and senior  with Premiership grade, Reserve grade, Women’s contact and Women’s league tag, and girls and boys starting from 4 years old to 18 in juniors

History
The Fremantle Rugby Club was formed in 1928 and converted to the Fremantle Rugby League club in 1948. It has been playing in the WA 1st division (NRL WA) for some 70 years now and our club has always relied on attracting local juniors to be the foundation of the club and to carry on into the senior ranks.

While evidence of Rugby being played in Fremantle has been traced back to the 1880s, it was in February 1948 when the Fremantle Rugby League Club was established. The first meeting was held by seven men, at the Park Hotel in Parry Street, Fremantle. Among the men at the meeting were Gordon Squires, R.W. Baguley, W. Watkins, Dr E.R. Dermer and Mr Hudson Taylor. Interest in establishing Rugby League started following the arrival of several ex-servicemen who settled in Perth after World War 2. These men included Gordon Squires, Roy Williams, Frank Baguley, Vie Hodgekiss, Alf Schaffer and Ken Allen. Meetings were held during the 1947 season at Barney Silbert's shop in Fremantle with the goal to establish a Rugby League competition in Perth. It commenced in 1948 with four clubs: Fremantle, Perth, South Perth and Cottesloe.

Fremantle's home ground for its first season was at Fremantle Park. They won its first rugby league premiership in 1950. The club relocated to Gibson Park in 1952 where it remained until moving to Ken Allen Field in 1978.

The 1960s and 1970s was a period of great success for Fremantle both on and off the field. The club benefited greatly from the many industries in the area at the time. Most players were recruited from the workshops, wharves and woolsheds that were a major part of Fremantle life in this period. Russell Addison and Brian Wedgwood, who both played for Fremantle in this era, progressed to play first grade in Sydney. From these teams were the names of players who would serve the club for many years to come including Ross White, George Booth, Vic Thacker, Ken Montgomery, Fred Henderson, Bob Sanders, Bob Hogue, Brian Wedgwood and Bob Rosser to name a few.

In the late 1960s, Fremantle adopted the Roosters nickname and the club song was conceived. Success continued in the 1970s thanks to a new generation of local players including Alec Lockley, who won a record four Brice Trophies, Ray Dorey, Gary Holtham, Peter Slater, Peter Cumins and Don (Rocky) Kurgan. Alec won his first trophy as a seventeen-year-old in 1973 and played a significant part in the Roosters 1976 & 1977 successes. Fremantle had plenty to celebrate in 1978. Apart from being the current premiers and moving to a new ground, the club also celebrated its Silver Jubilee. The social highlight of the year was the 50th Anniversary dinner held at Ascot Racecourse.

Besides celebrating the 50th Anniversary of the club, it also was a fundraiser for the construction of the new clubhouse. The purchase of gold, silver and bronze bricks from members, supporters, sponsors and local businesses funded the construction of the club. Built mainly on voluntary labour and the generosity of club members, who donated materials, the clubhouse was officially opened in February 1980. Apart from being the first licensed Rugby League club in WA, its design that allows members to watch the game from a balcony overlooking the field, has been successfully copied in other sporting codes. In 1980, the ground was officially named Ken Allen Field after the man who played a major role in establishing the game of Rugby League in WA.

Fremantle played in the 1981 Grand Final in a match that and is still talked about as one of the best games of rugby league ever seen in WA. Scores were locked at 28-all at full-time and an extra 20 minutes of extra time failed to separate the sides. With players constantly going down with cramp in the intense heat, both captains refused to play a further five minutes of extra time and the League unable to schedule a replay, a joint premiership was declared.

In the early 1980s Fremantle enjoyed a tremendous home ground advantage thanks to a large and vocal crowd support. By the late 1980s, the game had progressed to levels of professionalism never seen before and came the start of television exposure. This continued into the early 1990s until the Western Reds were formed.

Players are now drawn from a large catchment area that includes the local Fremantle area and the rapidly growing suburbs around Jandakot and Bibra Lake. While many other clubs pursued players for the eastern states, Fremantle has always prided itself on promoting its local junior players into its senior teams. This is still evident today as the sons and daughters of past players proudly don the Roosters colours in junior and senior grades.

Fremantle celebrated its 50th anniversary as a Rugby League club in 1998 and created its own piece of history in 1999 when it fielded a joint exhibition women's team (team merged from Fremantle & Willagee Bears) for the first time. Season 2000 saw the Fremanlte Willagee captain Miss Danielle Parker named as the first WA player to be chosen for an Australian team.

Fremantle has enjoyed a resurgence to the top of the NRL WA competition participating in 6 of the past 7 Grand Finals. In
2015 Fremantle won their first Flag since 1997, a feat they repeated against Rockingham in 2017.

2018 saw the Fremantle Rugby League Club celebrate its 70th Anniversary, which was capped with back-to-back Premierships against the Minor Premiers North Beach. 2019 saw a repeat as Fremantle three-peated against North Beach.

In 2022 the club relocated to Treeby Reserve and celebrated the move with the Minor Premiers and 12th premiership win.

Bryce Trophy / Ken Allen Medal winners

Bryce Trophy

1954  Arthur Smith
1965  Ian White
1966  Peter McLarty
1969  Noel Williams
1973  Alec Lockley
1974  Gary Hookman
1975  Alec Lockley
1977  Alec Lockley
1982  Alec Lockley
1987  Russell May
1991  Duncan Whitchurch

Ken Allen Medal

1993  Gavin Jones
1997  Kere Perata
1999  Brad Baker
2012  Samson Graham
2018  Delane Edwards

Notable Juniors
Russell Addison (1960-61 South Sydney Rabbitohs)
Brian Wedgewood (1967-70 Canterbury Bulldogs)

See also

Rugby league in Western Australia

References

External links
Fremantle Roosters Fox Sports pulse
 

Rugby league teams in Western Australia
Sporting clubs in Perth, Western Australia
1948 establishments in Australia
Rugby clubs established in 1948
Sport in Fremantle